The 80.002 was a combined assault rifle and grenade launcher prototype based on the AK-74. The weapon was developed at TsNIITochMash by Yu.V. Minaev, V.I. Chelikin, and G.A. Yanov between 1975 and 1979. The main difference from the Kalashnikov is the presence of two adjacent barrels of 5.45 mm and 12.7 mm respectively. The thickness of the receiver was double that of an AK-74. The 80.002 was not accepted for service.

See also
 Attached grenade launchers
 Objective Individual Combat Weapon program
 Daewoo K11
 List of Russian weaponry
 TKB-059

References

External links 
 image

12.7 mm firearms
5.45×39mm assault rifles
Trial and research firearms of the Soviet Union
Grenade launchers
Kalashnikov derivatives
Multiple-barrel firearms
Soviet inventions
TsNIITochMash products